G. Marthandan is an Indian film director who works in Malayalam cinema. His debut film is  Daivathinte Swantham Cleetus

Early life
G. Marthandan was born to M. S. Gopalan Nair and P. Kamalamma at Changanassery in Kottayam district of Kerala. He did his schooling at NSS Boys School Changanassery and completed his bachelor's degree in Economics at NSS Hindu College, Changanassery.

Career
After completing his bachelor's degree, Marthandan entered films as an associate director with the unreleased film Swarnachamaram directed by Rajeevnath in 1995. His next work was British Market, directed by Nissar in 1998. He worked as an associate director for 18 years.

He made his directional debut with Daivathinte Swantham Cleetus in 2013, starring Mammooty in the lead role. His next movie was in 2015, Acha Dhin, with Mammooty and Mansi Sharma in the lead roles. Daivathinte Swantham Cleetus and Paavada were box office successes.

Filmography

As director

As associate director

As actor

 TV serial
Kanyadanam (Malayalam TV series) - pilot episode

Awards
 Ramu Kariat Film Award - Paavada (2016)
 JCI Foundation Award - Daivathinte Swantham Cleetus (2013)

References

External links 
 
 

Malayalam film directors
People from Changanassery
Film directors from Kerala
21st-century Indian film directors
Living people
Year of birth missing (living people)